The first season of The Mighty B! originally aired in the United States on Nickelodeon between April 26, 2008, and June 12, 2009. The season was produced by Nickelodeon Animation Studios, Paper Kite Productions and Polka Dot Pictures, and series co-creators Amy Poehler, Cynthia True and Erik Wiese served as executive producers.

The series focuses on Bessie Higgenbottom (Poehler), an ambitious Honeybee scout with a dream of earning more badges than any other Honeybee, and turning into her superhero alter-ego The Mighty B. The season consisted of 38 eleven-minute segments, and one half-hour final titled "Dragonflies". Poehler, True and Wiese had been developing the series several years before its premiere. They talked about making a "female-driven" animated series, and it was picked up by Nickelodeon in early 2006 under the name of Super Scout.

The season received generally positive reviews. One reviewer called Bessie the "female answer to SpongeBob SquarePants".  1.92 million viewers among Kids 2–11 watched the series premiere, and the series averaged 3.1 million viewers each episode during the season.

Episodes

All episodes in this season were directed by Erik Wiese & Larry Leichliter

Production

Conception
Several years before The Mighty B! premiered, co-creator Amy Poehler and her friends at Nickelodeon talked about making a "female-driven" animated television series. Poehler stated; "where this girl is at that great age [...] where you're not boy-crazy and you're not mean to other girls". She found that enthusiasm "fascinating" and wanted to "bottle it and take it like a pill". Bessie is loosely based on a character Poehler had played during her time at improvisational comedy troupes Second City and Upright Citizens Brigade as well as girls she looked up to when she was younger. She described Bessie as a "feisty, plucky, bossy, Honey Bee scout".

The Mighty B! was picked up for a pilot in early 2006 under the name of Super Scout. It was co-created by Poehler, Cynthia True and Erik Wiese. Brown Johnson, president of animation at Nickelodeon, was "absolutely thrilled to have a comedy team of the caliber of Amy, Erik and Cynthia create this iconic character for a new generation".

Cast
Amy Poehler voices Bessie Higgenbottom, a 9¾ year old Honeybee scout. Poehler describes her as "superoptimistic and a super spaz" and "a bit bossy, but with good intentions". She is based on a character Poehler had played during her time at improvisational comedy troupes Second City and Upright Citizens Brigade, but also girls Poehler looked up to when she was younger, which she called "the leaders". Poehler provides the voice of Bessie only, but for the episode "Boston Beean", she provided the voice of Sissy Sullivan, a foreign Honeybee scout from Boston whose voice sounded exactly like Bessie's. Dee Bradley Baker voices Happy, Bessie's dog which she found at the harbor in the first episode "So Happy Together". Andy Richter voices Ben Higgenbottom, Bessie's younger brother. Richter is also the voice of Mort on the Nick show The Penguins of Madagascar. Richter talked about The Mighty B!, quoting: "[...] another dream come true, to be able to do cartoon voices! And, also, to get to do cartoon voices for [Ben and Mort] two really funny, cool cartoons that my kids love and that I'm proud to have them love. It's pretty great." Dannah Feinglass voices Penny, Bessie's sidekick. Feinglass is also a writer for the show. Grey DeLisle voices Portia Gibbons, a Honeybee scout, Megan Cavanagh voices Hilary Higgenbottom, Bessie and Ben's single mother, Sarah Thyre voices Mary Frances Gibbons, Portia's mother, and Jessica DiCicco voices Gwen, Portia's friend.

Reception

Critical reception
The season received generally positive reviews from television sources and critics. Brian Lowry of Variety said that the show "has the kind of crazed energy and inventiveness that isn't associated often enough with girl-oriented children's fare [...] The Mighty B! opts for a more elevated approach – like that aforementioned roller-coaster jaunt, taking a free-spirited jump off the tracks and trusting its audience to hang on for the ride." David Hinckley of Daily News gave the show four stars, stating: "The Mighty B! has a decent shot at becoming a pre-tween fave." Aaron H. Bynum of Animation Insider called the show a "good, brainless cartoon [...] Viewers shouldn't ever be bored with Bessie [but] the comedy really doesn't try to do too much, which may ultimately work against it when the story calls for the characters to do too little. 

Joanne Ostrow of the Denver Post called Bessie the "female answer to SpongeBob SquarePants". Emily Ashby of Common Sense Media gave the show three stars out of five, saying: "The show maintains a chaotic pace, and there are no real attempts to teach strong positive lessons [...] Young tweens will likely enjoy Bessie's outlandish, fantasy-fueled adventures – which are fast-paced and, on the surface, entertaining." Ed Liu of Toon Zone called The Mighty B! a show that he admires more than he "truly love[s]", stating: "There is prodigious talent behind it and its wonderfully energetic, boisterous comedy. It's clearly trying very, very hard to be entertaining and largely succeeds [...] I almost feel bad for not liking The Mighty B! more than I do, and I'm still not sure why I don't enjoy it more". He also said that it was worth pointing out that more recent episodes of the show seem "more assured and funnier" than the eight episodes on the We Got the Bee DVD.

Ratings
The Mighty B! premiered at 10:30am on April 26, 2008, and scored "above average for Nickelodeon programming" in the Nielsen ratings. It ranked in the top ten of all programming for combined broadcast and basic cable shows, with 1.92 million viewers in the Kids 2–11 demographic and a rating of 5.2/23. The Mighty B! had double the viewership as Bakugan Battle Brawlers, a show that aired simultaneously on Cartoon Network.

In September 2008, the show had an average of 3.1 million viewers, and in the second quarter of 2008, the show ranked among the top five animated programs on television. During the third quarter of 2009, it averaged 2.6 million viewers, and was number-one in its timeslot in the kids 2–11 and kids 6–11 demographics.

DVD releases
A DVD called We Got The Bee was released on February 24, 2009. It contained eight episodes, behind the scenes footage, an animatic version of the episode "Bat Mitzvah Crashers" and a karaoke music video for "Running with the Rainbow Unicorn". A second DVD called BEEing Bessie Higgenbottom was released on December 8, 2009, where it contained seven episodes, a karaoke music video for "Buzz Off", an animatic of the episode "Bee Patients", and audio commentary of the episodes of "Bee Patients", "Ben Appetit", and "Name Shame", provided by Amy Poehler, Andy Richter, Dee Bradley Baker, Grey DeLisle, Erik Wiese, and Eddie Trigueros.

References

External links
Season 1 at the Internet Movie Database

2008 American television seasons
2009 American television seasons
The Mighty B!